The Federal Information Security Modernization Act of 2014 (Pub.L. 113-283, S. 2521; commonly referred to as FISMA Reform) was signed into federal law by President Barack Obama on December 18, 2014. Passed as a response to the increasing amount of cyber attacks on the federal government, it amended existing laws to enable the federal government to better respond to cyber attacks on departments and agencies.

An earlier version of the legislation was proposed by House Oversight and Government Reform Chairman Darrell Issa and co-sponsored by the Committee's Ranking Member Elijah Cummings as H.R.1163 Federal Information Security Amendments Act of 2013. The bill was passed by the U.S. House of Representatives on a vote of 416–0.

The final version of the legislation was introduced to the United States Senate Committee on Homeland Security and Governmental Affairs by Thomas Carper (D–DE) on June 24, 2014 and passed December 8, 2014 in the Senate and December 10, 2014 in the House.

References

External links
 NIST Special Publications Library
 NIST FISMA Implementation Project Home Page
 OMB Memoranda
 DHS Directives (including Binding Operational Directives and Emergency Directives)
 FISMApedia Project
 FISMA Resources

Acts of the 113th United States Congress
Information Security Management
United States federal computing legislation
Security compliance